Deltoplastis sincera is a moth in the family Lecithoceridae. It was described by Alexey Diakonoff in 1952. It is found in Burma.

References

Moths described in 1952
Deltoplastis
Moths of Asia